The Salchow jump is an edge jump in figure skating. It was named after its inventor, Ulrich Salchow, in 1909. The Salchow is accomplished with a takeoff from the back inside edge of one foot and a landing on the back outside edge of the opposite foot. It is "usually the first jump that skaters learn to double, and the first or second to triple". Timing is critical because both the takeoff and landing must be on the backward edge. A Salchow is deemed cheated if the skate blade starts to turn forward before the takeoff, or if it has not turned completely backward when the skater lands back on the ice.

History

The Salchow jump is an edge jump in the sport of figure skating. It was named after its inventor, Swedish world champion Ulrich Salchow in 1909. According to writer Ellyn Kestnbaum, American skater Theresa Weld "received reprimands" at the 1920 Olympics "for performing a single Salchow jump because her skirt would fly up to her knees, creating an image deemed too risque".

In competitions, the base value of a single Salchow is 0.40; the base value of a double Salchow is 1.30; the base value of a triple Salchow is 4.30; and the base value of a quadruple Salchow is 9.70.

Firsts

Multiple quadruple Salchows in one program

Execution

According to the ISU, the Salchow jump is an edge jump. Its takeoff is made from the back inside edge of one foot and its landing is made on the back outside edge of the opposite foot. The skater enters into the jump with a backward approach, launches it using their inside edge, and lands on the opposite outside edge. The free leg is extended behind the skater and swings toward the front as they spring into the air while, at the same time, drawing in their arms. Skaters do not have to draw in their arms or free leg close to their bodies while performing the single Salchow because bringing the free side of their bodies forward and around the opposite side of their bodies after they turn towards the back, is enough to produce the necessary rotation.  

The rotation in the air, with respect to a fixed point, is slightly less than 360 degrees because the takeoff edge curves in the same direction as the rotation in the air. When a skater pulls the arms into their body and/or brings their free leg inward, more rotations can be performed; for this reason, the Salchow is "usually the first jump that skaters learn to double, and the first or second to triple". As U.S. Figure Skating states, however, "timing is critical" because both the takeoff and landing must be on the backward edge.

Footnotes

References

Works cited
 Hines, James R. (2011). Historical Dictionary of Figure Skating. Lanham, Maryland: Scarecrow Press. .
 "ISU Figure Skating Media Guide 2022/23". (Media guide) International Skating Union. 17 October 2022. Retrieved 19 November 2022.
 Kestnbaum, Ellyn (2003). Culture on Ice: Figure Skating and Cultural Meaning. Middletown, Connecticut: Wesleyan University Press. .

Figure skating elements
Jumping sports